WXBX (95.3 FM) is an oldies and classic hits formatted broadcast radio station licensed to Rural Retreat, Virginia, serving the Wytheville and Wythe County, Virginia area. WXBX is owned and operated by Three Rivers Media Corporation.

References

External links
Kool 95.3 Online

XBX
Oldies radio stations in the United States
Classic hits radio stations in the United States
Radio stations established in 1991